The 2004 California Republican presidential primary was held on March 2, 2004, the same day as the Democratic primary. As expected, incumbent President George W. Bush won near-unanimously over the disbanded opposition. Bush later won the general election over Senator John Kerry of Massachusetts.

Results

See also
2004 California Democratic presidential primary
2004 Republican Party presidential primaries
2004 United States presidential election in California

References

California
2004 California elections
2004